The Heritage College & Seminary is a Baptist theological institute in Cambridge, Ontario, Canada. It is affiliated with the Fellowship of Evangelical Baptist Churches in Canada.

History
Central Baptist Seminary was itself formed out of a split in fundamentalist Baptist ranks when, in 1948, firebrand Baptist leader Thomas Todhunter Shields, then head of the Union of Regular Baptist Churches of Ontario and Quebec, dismissed Dean W. Gordon Brown from his seminary.  Brown and 50 students then went on to begin a new seminary holding more moderate positions under the direction of President Jack Scott.  The first number of years the seminary was housed at Forward Baptist Church in Toronto, Ontario. In 1950, the seminary acquired a new building at 225 St. George Street, Toronto. In its formative years, CBS provided undergraduate and graduate theological education until the mid-1980s.  In later years the seminary was moved to Gormley, Ontario (north of Toronto).

London Baptist Seminary began in 1976 in London, Ontario. The school provided undergraduate and graduate theological education. In 1981, the school's name changed to London Baptist Bible College and London Baptist Seminary (LBBC & LBS).

In 1991, the Ontario legislature officially recognized the seminary as a degree-granting institution through the passage of "An Act to Incorporate the Heritage Baptist College and Heritage Theological Seminary, 1991, 1991".

Heritage was founded in 1993 through the merger of the former London Baptist Bible College and Seminary of London, Ontario and Central Baptist Seminary of Toronto, Ontario.

Administration and organizational structure
Heritage College and Seminary is governed by a Board of Governors composed of distinguished Christian leaders from across Ontario. Heritage has adopted a Carver Policy Governance model for the Board of Governors and the institution. Heritage College and Seminary is affiliated with the Fellowship of Evangelical Baptist Churches in Canada (Central Region), to whose churches the school serve s along with other like-minded evangelical churches, organizations, and denominations.

The current President of Heritage College & Seminary is Rick Reed. Reed's appointment to the office began in January 2013. Prior to his appointment, Reed served as the senior pastor of Metropolitan Bible Church in Ottawa, Ontario.

After the retirement of former Vice President of Academics, David Barker, J. Stephen Yuille was appointed to the office, serving also as the Academic Dean of the college. Prior to his appointment, Yuille was the teaching pastor of Grace Community Church in Glen Rose, Texas. Yuille has been an associate professor of biblical spirituality at The Southern Baptist Theological Seminary since 2015.

Heritage is currently organized into two schools:

 College (confers undergraduate degrees and certificates)
 Seminary (confers graduate degrees and certificates)

J. Stephen Yuille is the Vice President of Academics and Academic Dean of the College. Barry Howson is the Academic Dean of the Seminary.

Accreditation
As an institution granting both undergraduate and graduate degrees, all of Heritage's degrees are accredited by The Association for Biblical Higher Education.  The graduate school is also accredited by the Association of Theological Schools in the United States and Canada.

Academics, philosophy and faculty
For the college and seminary, the educational mission is "to glorify God by partnering with churches and parachurch organizations in providing a biblically based education equipping people for life and ministry in the church and in the world. More specifically, the College has its mission statement as: "to provide an evangelical, faith-based, university-level education to equip students for life and serve in the church, community and the world." The Seminary's mission statement is: "to equip people for biblically and theologically grounded leadership and ministry to serve the mission of Christ and his church through their involvement in evangelical churches, denominations, mission agencies, and parachurch ministries.

With eight core faculty and twenty-four adjunct faculty, the college offers undergraduate-level certificates and degrees in a range of disciplines. All Heritage bachelor's degree programs are Bible and Theology majors consisting of 30+ credit hours in Bible/Theology and Biblical Studies. In addition, the Bachelor of Church Music and the Bachelor of Religious Education––Honours degree programs are double majors consisting of the specific degree major in addition to the Bible/Theology major.

Heritage Seminary currently has seven core faculty and nine adjunct faculty. The Seminary offers graduate-level programs in biblical and pastoral studies. Degrees include: Master of Divinity, Master of Divinity (Research track), and Master of Theological Studies.

Notable associates

Alumni
 D. A. Carson, evangelical scholar and author.
 V. George Shillington, biblical scholar and professor.
 John Kao (minister), pastor and founder of the Association of Christian Evangelical Ministries (Canada).
 Jack Hannah (minister), pastor and former president of Central Baptist Seminary (1989–1993)
 Hannah Leutbecher, medical missionary at the Ellichpur hospital in Pakistan
Elizabeth Wettlaufer, former nurse and convicted serial killer

Faculty
Michael A.G. Haykin, church historian and professor.
W. Gordon Brown, New Testament scholar and founding dean of Central Baptist Seminary
Leslie K. Tarr, evangelical author, journalist, and founding editor of Faith Today magazine

Presidents: Central Baptist Seminary
 1948–1957 Jack Scott
 1958–1960 John F. Holliday
 1961–1963 E. Sidney Kerr
 1964–1969 W. Gordon Brown (interim)
 1969–1974 Don A. Loveday
 1974–1978 Jack Scott
 1978–1979 Paul Holliday
 1980–1982 Jim G. Wetherall (acting)
 1982–1989 George Bell
 1989 Jack Hannah
 1989–1991 Vacant (Management Team)
 1991–1993 Stanley K. Fowler (acting)

Chancellors: Central Baptist Seminary, Toronto
 Hal MacBain
 Jack Scott

Deans: Central Baptist Seminary, Toronto
 George (Ted) Barton
 W. Gordon Brown
 Stanley Fowler
 Paul Holliday
 Denzil Raymer
 John Wilson

Presidents: London Baptist Seminary
 1976–1988 Gerry Benn
 1988–1990 David G. Barker (acting)
 1990–1993 Marvin Brubacher

Presidents: Heritage College and Seminary
 1993–2011 Marvin Brubacher
 2013–present Rick Reed

References

External links
Official website

Universities in Ontario
Baptist seminaries and theological colleges in Canada
Private universities and colleges in Canada
1991 establishments in Ontario
Educational institutions established in 1991
Education in Cambridge, Ontario